Column Rock is a conspicuous rock pinnacle  north of Gourdin Island, Trinity Peninsula. The descriptive name was applied by the UK Antarctic Place-Names Committee.

References 

Rock formations of the Trinity Peninsula